Yang Shuo may refer to:

 Yang Shuo (writer) (1913–1968), Chinese lyricist and essayist
 Yang Shuo (actor) (born 1983), Chinese actor